Græ is the second studio album by American singer-songwriter Moses Sumney. The double album was released in two parts by Jagjaguwar. The first part was released digitally on February 21, 2020, followed by the full album, including its second part, on May 15, 2020.

Græ features contributions from a wide range of musicians, writers and producers, including Daniel Lopatin, Thundercat, Jill Scott, James Blake, Taiye Selasi, John Congleton, Rob Moose, Ezra Miller, Michael Chabon, Matthew Otto, Ian Chang, and FKJ.

The album was preceded by five singles: "Virile", "Polly", "Me in 20 Years", "Cut Me", and "Bless Me".

Background and recording
Some of the songs on Græ, including "Virile", were recorded by Sumney with drummer Ian Chang of Son Lux and producer/engineer Ben Baptie at Echo Mountain Recording in Asheville, North Carolina. Sumney first lived in Asheville before and during the making of Aromanticism, and Græ is Sumney's first album since officially relocating to Asheville from Los Angeles. The album was mixed by Ben Baptie at Strongroom and mastered by Joe LaPorta at Sterling Sound.

Release
"Virile" was released as the album's first single on November 14, 2019. The album was announced the same day.

"Polly" was released as the second single on December 13, 2019, followed by "Me in 20 Years" on January 6, 2020, and "Cut Me" on February 7. Sumney made his US television debut with a performance of the latter track on The Late Show with Stephen Colbert on February 11. The album's first part was released digitally on February 21.

"Bless Me" was released as the album's fifth and final single on May 11, 2020, with the full album released four days later.

Critical reception

Græ received rave reviews from contemporary music critics. At Metacritic, which assigns a normalised rating out of 100 from reviews from mainstream critics, the album received a score of 90, based on 17 reviews, indicating "universal acclaim". According to Metacritic, it was the 5th best-reviewed album of 2020. Aggregator AnyDecentMusic? gave it 8.4 out of 10, based on their assessment of the critical consensus.

A. D. Amorosi of Variety praised the album, calling it a "magnificent, multi-genre mess in a dress of many colors" and "one of the year's boldest and best." Jenessa Williams of DIY gave the album a perfect score, calling it "complex, unconventional and ultimately, essential." Marcus J. Moore of Entertainment Weekly gave the album an A, writing, "græ finds him trying to be, well, everything, and through a convergence of folk, jazz, classical, and art-rock, along with his probing lyricism, Sumney has managed to produce a sonic marvel."

Max Freedman of The A.V. Club praised Part 1 for showcasing Sumney "step outside previous comfort zones" with "Conveyor", "Neither/Nor", and "Virile". However, Freedman criticized Part 2 as lacking the stylistic and thematic variety of Part 1 and for occupying "shockingly familiar musical territory" to that of the songs on Aromanticism.

Year-end lists

Track listing
Credits adapted from the liner notes of Græ.

Notes
  signifies an additional producer.
 "Insula", "Boxes", "Jill/Jack", "Also Also Also And And And", "And So I Come to Isolation" and "Before You Go" are stylized in all lowercase.
 "Gagarin" contains elements from "Gagarin's Point Of View", written by Esbjörn Svensson, Dan Berglund and Magnus Öström.
 "Jill/Jack" contains interpolations from "Cross My Mind", written by Jill Scott.

Personnel
Credits are adapted from the liner notes of Græ.

Musicians
 Moses Sumney – vocals , piano , guitar , keyboards , bass , percussion , synthesizers , saxophone and flute arrangements , additional percussion , piano FX 
 Thundercat – bass 
 Daniel Lopatin – synthesizers , bass , drum programming , keyboards 
 Rob Moose – strings , string arrangement 
 Keith Tutt II – strings , cello 
 Adult Jazz – bass , synthesizers , horns , piano 
 Brandon Coleman – bass , synthesizers , piano , additional synthesizers 
 Ian Chang – drums , drum programming , percussion 
 Jonathan Slater – horns 
 Jamire Williams – drums 
 Matthew Otto – synthesizers 
 Noah Kardos-Fein – guitar 
 Ben Baptie – drum programming , additional synthesizers , piano FX 
 Brandee Younger – harp 
 Nubya Garcia – flute 
 Mike Haldeman – guitar , guitar FX 
 John Keek – saxophone 
 Shahzad Ismaily – bass synthesizer , additional synthesizers , bass 
 FKJ – saxophone , keyboards , synthesizers , all instrumentation 
 Shabaka Hutchings – saxophone 
 Tunde Jegede – kora 
 Tom Gallo – guitar 
 James Blake – drum programming , keyboards 
 John Congleton – guitar , additional percussion 
 Jamie Stewart – organ , drum programming 

Engineers
 Moses Sumney – engineering 
 Daniel Lopatin – engineering 
 Steph Marziano – engineering 
 Jake Viator – engineering 
 Ricardo Wheelock – engineering 
 Matthew Otto – engineering 
 Mac DeMarco – engineering 
 Andrew Chugg – engineering 
 Alexis Berthelot – engineering 
 Ben Baptie – engineering , mixing
 Rashaan Carter – engineering 
 Simon Ribchester – engineering 
 FKJ – engineering 
 Matt Cohn – engineering 
 Sean Cook – engineering 
 Tom Gallo – engineering 
 James Blake – engineering 
 Tom Archer – mix assistance
 Joe LaPorta – mastering

Artwork
 Moses Sumney – art direction
 Julian Gross – art direction, design
 Eric Gyamfi – photography

Charts

References

External links
 Græ Lyric Booklet at Sumney's website.

2020 albums
Moses Sumney albums
Jagjaguwar albums
Albums produced by John Congleton